Bohler Canyon is a valley in Mono County, California, in the United States. 

Bohler Canyon was named for Joseph Bohler, an early settler.

References

Canyons and gorges of California 
Landforms of Mono County, California